Widows Bar Lock and Dam was a dam once located along the Tennessee River in Jackson County, Alabama, USA. The dam was completed 8 September 1924, and was designed and operated by the U.S. Army Corps of Engineers. When the Tennessee Valley Authority took control of flood control and navigation improvement operations in the Tennessee Valley in the 1930s, Widows Bar was considered too high maintenance, and it was dismantled as part of the construction of Guntersville Dam.  

The Widows Bar Dam site is currently occupied by Widows Creek Power Plant, a coal-fired plant built in the early 1950s.  What remained of the dam after its dismantling is now submerged under Guntersville Lake.

References

Dams in Alabama
Tennessee Valley Authority dams
Buildings and structures in Jackson County, Alabama
United States Army Corps of Engineers dams
Dams completed in 1924